Eugene "Gene” Samuel (born October 15, 1960) is a semi-retired track cyclist and road cyclist from Trinidad and Tobago, who represented his native country at four consecutive Summer Olympics, starting in 1984 where he placed fourth, missing the bronze medal by 4/100ths of a second. He won a gold, a silver and a bronze medal in the Men's 1,000m Time Trial at three different Pan American Games. Samuel is a well-known bunch race track cyclist for his never-say-die competitive attitude and his warrior spirit, hence his nickname, "Geronimo". He broke the World Professional record in the 1000 metre time-trial in Cali, Colombia, in 1992. He was a World Champion bronze medallist in the 1000 metre time trial in 1991 at the World Championships in Stuttgart, Germany, a few days after winning the gold medal at the Pan American Games and breaking the track record in Havana, Cuba. He won double gold medals at the 1986 CAC Games in Santo Domingo and broke the 1000m track record in the process. He has three times been Sportsman of the Year in Trinidad and Tobago and also was inducted into the Sports Hall of Fame in 2000.

He was awarded the National Award of the Chaconia Silver Medal for long and meritorious service to country in sport. He was named as one of the top 100 sportsmen in the 20th century for Trinidad and Tobago. He was named as one of the top 50 Legends in Sport for the 50th Independence Celebrations in Trinidad and Tobago. He has won an unprecedented over 65 Elite National Championship Track Champion Titles.

He also owns and manages a cycling shop in Woodbrook, Port of Spain, Trinidad, called Geronimo's Cycle & Sport Ltd. He coaches and trains with a local cycling team and is still avidly racing with great success amongst the much younger, professional elite cyclists.

On August 26, 2011 Samuel was inducted into the Trexlertown Velodrome ("T-Town") Hall of Fame in Trexlertown, Pennsylvania, in the United States.

References

External links

1960 births
Living people
Trinidad and Tobago male cyclists
Cyclists at the 1984 Summer Olympics
Cyclists at the 1988 Summer Olympics
Cyclists at the 1992 Summer Olympics
Cyclists at the 1996 Summer Olympics
Cyclists at the 1987 Pan American Games
Cyclists at the 1991 Pan American Games
Cyclists at the 1995 Pan American Games
Olympic cyclists of Trinidad and Tobago
Place of birth missing (living people)
Pan American Games gold medalists for Trinidad and Tobago
Pan American Games silver medalists for Trinidad and Tobago
Pan American Games bronze medalists for Trinidad and Tobago
Pan American Games medalists in cycling
Medalists at the 1987 Pan American Games
Medalists at the 1991 Pan American Games
Medalists at the 1995 Pan American Games